{{DISPLAYTITLE:C15H21NO}}
The molecular formula C15H21NO (molar mass : 231.33 g/mol) may refer to:

 4-Dimethylamino-4-(p-tolyl)cyclohexanone
 Eptazocine
 Metazocine, an opioid analgesic
 4'-Methyl-α-pyrrolidinobutiophenone
 8-OH-PBZI
 α-Pyrrolidinopentiophenone